Egypt–Pakistan relations refers to the bilateral relations between the Arab Republic of Egypt and the Islamic Republic of Pakistan. Modern relations traced back to 1947 when founder of Pakistan Muhammad Ali Jinnah paid a farewell visit to Egypt on the special invitation sent by King Fuad II.  Egypt has an embassy in Islamabad and Pakistan has an embassy in Cairo. Both countries are members of the OIC (Organisation of Islamic Cooperation) and the "D8". Pakistan and Egypt are both designated Major Non-NATO allies, giving them access to certain levels of hardware and surplus military equipment from the United States.

Both Egypt and Pakistan have a close nationalist bond, the two nations were founded as modern nation-states in an era of nationalism, with a pre-dominant Muslim population. Modern Egypt regards its founder as Muhammad Ali of Egypt while Muhammad Ali Jinnah is regarded as Pakistan's founder.

History
Egypt and Pakistan have had political, commercial and cultural relations since antiquity, including long-lasting trade through the Red Sea-Indian Ocean maritime routes and conquest by the Persians, Alexander the Great and Arabs. The ancient Greeks commented that the people living along the Indus River were most similar to ancient Egyptians in appearance, with Arrian's Indica stating:"The southern Indians resemble the Ethiopians a good deal, and, are black of countenance, and their hair black also, only they are not as snub-nosed or so woolly-haired as the Ethiopians; but the northern Indians are most like the Egyptians in appearance."

Egypt and Pakistan established diplomatic relations in 1951. In the 1950s, Pakistan became part of the Baghdad pact and cento, with its pro western foreign diplomacy which led to harsh frictions with Egypt. However, later relations improved quickly.

During the 1967 and 1973 wars, Pakistan and sent Egypt military aide, technicians, and personnel to aid the Egyptian military at war with Israel.

During war Egypt war with Israel, Pakistan Army sent weapons and fighter planes to Egypt.

In 1974, President of Egypt Anwar Sadat visited Pakistan to attend the second OIC meeting held in Lahore, Punjab, and generally supported Pakistan's plans to become a nuclear power. But, however, the relations with Pakistan went sour when Pakistan began ties with the former Soviet Union. The worsening of relations of Pakistan with the United States further played a key role.

Nonetheless, the relations were normal with Egypt after the removal of Prime minister Zulfikar Ali Bhutto. In 1980s, President Hosni Mubarak and President Zia-ul-Haq further enhanced the relations; Egypt also played a vital role in Soviet–Afghan War where Egypt widely provided manpower (see Afghan Arabs) and military equipment to Afghan mujahideen in their fight against the Soviets. In 1988–1990 and 1993–1996, Egypt's relations were soured with Pakistan Peoples Party formerly led by Benazir Bhutto who was generally close with the Soviet Union.

1995 Egyptian embassy bombing
In 1995, a disastrous car bombing took place in Islamabad that targeted the Egyptian Embassy which the Egyptian Islamic Jihad claimed responsibility for. A massive manhunt was initiated by ISI and all assailants were arrested in 2001 and were extradited to Egypt.

Military relations
The Pakistani and Egyptian military maintain close relations in the fields of defence production, and the two nations frequently maintain contacts of high-level delegations of military chiefs, in a meeting with Raheel Sharif, Egypt's president affirmed his wish to further promote military co-operation with Pakistan.

Economic relations
Egypt and Pakistan have agreed to enhance the existing level of co-operation between the two countries which include economic and commercial relations, investment opportunities, co-operation in public and civil services, health sector, agriculture, and postal, both countries would further enhance their co-operation in the alternative energy sector particularly wind power generation.

There are over 700 Pakistanis living in Egypt, mainly in Cairo and Alexandria. Relations are helped by the fact that both states are majority-Muslim and there is a strong people to people contact between both countries.

See also
 Foreign relations of Egypt 
 Foreign relations of Pakistan

References

 
Egypt